The Gluepot Tavern was a live music venue in Auckland, New Zealand. It closed in 1994.

The building was opened in 1937. It is located at 340 Ponsonby Road in Ponsonby on a prominent junction known as Three Lamps Corner. It was designed by Frederick Browne. It stands on the site of an earlier hotel dating to the 1870s. This earlier hotel, nicknamed "The Gluepot" or "The Old Gluepot" possibly because men would go there for a quick drink and then be 'stuck' there all evening, was demolished in 1936. Officially known as the Ponsonby Club Hotel, the nickname "The Gluepot" became official sometime during the late 1960s or early 1970s.

Regular clientele of the Gluepot over the years included New Zealand's first Labour Party Prime Minister, Michael Joseph Savage, who lived nearby. Owing to its importance in the history of the New Zealand live music scene and the cultural life of Auckland, the building gained a Category II listing from Heritage New Zealand in 1994.

Bands
From the mid 1960s to the mid 1970s, the style of music at The Gluepot catered predominantly for a Māori and Pacific Island audience. Blind Māori group The Radars had a residency at the tavern that lasted seven years which came to an end in the mid 1970s. Notable entertainers to have appeared at The Gluepot during this time included Billy T. James and Prince Tui Teka.

From 1977, the style of the bands appearing at The Gluepot changed, with more pakeha bands appearing and more emphasis on louder rock music. A who's-who of New Zealand bands appeared at The Gluepot, including Hello Sailor, Citizen Band, Th' Dudes, Mi-Sex, Toy Love, The Screaming Meemees, The Chills, The Verlaines, Straitjacket Fits, The Clean, and Snapper. The official capacity was around 600, though The Chills reputedly drew 1200 to one of their gigs. The venue also attracted overseas acts whose style suited small to medium-sized venues, among them John Cale, Hunters and Collectors, Nico, Paul Kelly, Warren Zevon, Lucinda Williams, John Prine, and Toots and The Maytals. Part of Zevon's 1992 performance would later be released as part of his live Learning to Flinch album.

References

Music venues in New Zealand
Culture in Auckland
Buildings and structures in Auckland
Heritage New Zealand Category 2 historic places in the Auckland Region